The Army Public School is a public high school in Binnaguri, Jalpaiguri district, West Bengal, India. The school is run by the Army Welfare Education Society (AWES) and is affiliated with the Central Board of Secondary Education. Army Public School educates over 1,200 students in Grades I to XII with Science, Commerce and Humanities streams.

History 
The school was founded on 3 June 1993, as a primary school, having classes in Grades I to V. Grades VI-IX were added for 1995–96. In April 1996, the school was upgraded to Grade X. The Senior Secondary level (Grades XI and XII) was added from the academic session 2003–04.

The new building was inaugurated, in April 2007, by Lt. Gen. CKS Sabu.

Houses 
There are four houses:

 Gandhi (Yellow)
 Nehru (Red)
 Shastri (Green)
 Tagore (Blue)

Facilities 
The school has a range of facilities:

 Two basketball courts
 Physics, Chemistry, Biology labs
 One football ground
 One hockey ground
 Two badminton courts
 Two volleyball courts
 Auditorium
 Library 
Two computer labs
 Music room 
 Science Park
 Herbal garden
 Junior playground
 Smart Class Facility

Streams after Grade X

External links 
 

Indian Army Public Schools
Primary schools in West Bengal
High schools and secondary schools in West Bengal
Schools in Jalpaiguri district
Educational institutions established in 1993
1993 establishments in West Bengal